Casuarina glauca, commonly known as the swamp she-oak, swamp oak, grey oak, or river oak, is a species of Casuarina native to the east coast of Australia. It is found from central Queensland south to southern New South Wales. It has become naturalised in the Everglades in Florida where it is considered a weed.

Taxonomy
Franz Sieber described the swamp oak as Casuarina glauca in 1826. The species name is derived from the Latin glauca "glaucous".

The Kabi name for the plant, bilai, was used for the town and locality of Bli Bli, Queensland. The gadigal name is guman.

It is closely related to C. cunninghamiana. Hybrids with C. cunninghamiana subsp. cunninghamiana have been recorded where the two species co-occur, such as at Lower Portland and Wisemans Ferry.

Description
 
The swamp oak grows as medium sized tree, 8–20 m high tree, or rarely over 30 m tall. It can be restricted to a stunted shrub around  2 m (7 ft) tall when exposed to the elements on clifftops. The greyish brown bark has scales and small fissures. The branches have numerous drooping branchlets that are up to 38 cm long, and composed of small cylindrical segments known as articles. These articles are 8 to 20 mm long and 0.9–1.2 mm wide. The leaves themselves are reduced to tiny 'teeth' that are 0.6 to 0.9 mm long. 12–17 (rarely 20) teeth arise from the nodes between articles on the branchlets. The oval cones are 9–18 mm long by 7–9 mm wide.

Distribution and habitat
Casuarina glauca is found along Australia's east coast from Yeppoon in central Queensland to Bermagui in southern New South Wales. Some stands within the Royal Botanic Gardens in Sydney predate European settlement. Populations along the New South Wales coastline are at risk due to clearing of habitat for development. It has become highly invasive in Florida.

Casuarina glauca grows in or near brackish water along the banks of rivers and estuaries. Suckering from the roots, the swamp oak can form dense stands of trees. It grows on alluvial soils of sandstone or shale origin. The water table lies 30 cm or less under the surface. This tree then acts to turn shallows into land by preventing erosion and collecting material among its roots.

Ecology
C. glauca is an actinorhizal plant producing root nitrogen-fixing nodules infested by Frankia. There is a regular pattern of cell layers containing flavans. Although not a legume, C. glauca, produces a hemoglobin (not a leghemoglobin) in its symbiotic root nodules.

The rat's tail orchid (Dendrobium teretifolium) grows on the swamp oak.

The larvae of the she-oak moth, Pernattia pusilla, feed on C. glauca.

Casuarina glauca trees can live to 100 to 200 years.

Trees regenerate after fire by growing from the roots. Cut stumps sprout suckers vigorously, producing groves of new trees. Casuarina glauca trees drop large amounts of litter, mainly old cones and branchlets, which eventually rots down and enriches the soil unless removed by a flood event.

Understory plants recorded from swamp oak groves include Juncus kraussii, Baumea juncea and Sporobolus virginicus on sandier soils and Apium prostratum, Carex appressa, Goodenia ovata, Juncus kraussii and Phragmites australis and the vine Parsonsia straminea on clay soils.

Glossy black cockatoos break the cones to eat the seeds, which mature in winter. The seed is eaten by the red-browed finch, and peaceful dove (Geopelia placida).

Cultivation and uses
Casuarina glauca has been planted widely as a street tree in Canberra. It was introduced to Haiti to stabilise the soil and to be used as timber for poles, and to Florida where it was planted as an ornamental plant and windbreak.

The bark has been used to plant orchids on.

It tolerates waterlogged soils and even soils with some salinity. A significant inconvenience in urban settings is that its roots can invade underground water and sewer pipes if these are within 15 m (50 ft) of the tree. It can also acidify acid sulphate soils as it lowers the water table.

Two prostrate forms are commercially available: Casuarina 'Cousin It' is a cultivar arising from material from Booderee National Park on the New South Wales south coast collected in 1989 and named for its resemblance to Cousin Itt, and C. ‘Kattang Karpet’ is propagated by the Australian Botanic Garden from material collected at Kattang Nature Reserve on the New South Wales mid-north coast in 1998.

References

External links

glauca
Fagales of Australia
Flora of New South Wales
Flora of Queensland
Trees of Australia
Plants described in 1826